Montazels is a commune in the Aude department in the Occitanie region of France.

Population

Personalities
Bérenger Saunière, controversial Roman Catholic priest of Rennes-le-Château, was born in Montazels on 11 April 1852.

See also
Communes of the Aude department

References

Communes of Aude
Aude communes articles needing translation from French Wikipedia